The 1993 Volta a Catalunya was the 73rd edition of the Volta a Catalunya cycle race, which was held from 9 September to 15 September 1993. The race started in Sant Feliu de Guíxols and finished in Vielha. The race was won by Álvaro Mejía of the Motorola team.

General classification

References

1993
Volta
1993 in Spanish road cycling
September 1993 sports events in Europe